The South Africa women's cricket team played against the India women's cricket team in March 2021. Five Women's One Day International (WODI) and three Women's Twenty20 International (WT20I) matches were played at the Ekana Cricket Stadium in Lucknow. Despite the short notice of the tour, Cricket South Africa confirmed that tests for COVID-19 had been done and the team was ready to travel. Prior to the tour, India's last international match was the final of the 2020 ICC Women's T20 World Cup on 8 March 2020. The South African team arrived in Lucknow on 26 February 2021, before undergoing six days of quarantine.

South Africa won the first WODI with India winning the second match to level the series at 1–1. South Africa then won the next two WODIs to win the series with a game to spare. South Africa won the fifth WODI by five wickets to take the series 4–1.

Ahead of the WT20I series, India's captain Harmanpreet Kaur was ruled out of the matches due to an injury, with Smriti Mandhana captaining India in her place. South Africa won the first two WT20I matches, recording their first series win against India in the format. India won the final match by nine wickets, with South Africa winning the series 2–1.

Squads

WODI series

1st WODI

2nd WODI

3rd WODI

4th WODI

5th WODI

WT20I series

1st WT20I

2nd WT20I

3rd WT20I

Notes

References

External links
 Series home at ESPN Cricinfo

South Africa 2020-21
India 2020-21
International cricket competitions in 2020–21
2021 in Indian cricket
cricket
2021 in women's cricket